Albert Naughton (19 January 1929 – 27 September 2013), also known by the nickname of "Ally", was an English World Cup winning professional rugby league footballer who played as a  or  in the 1940s, 1950s and 1960s. 

He played at representative level for Great Britain, England and Lancashire, and at club level for Widnes and Warrington (captain).

Background
Ally Naughton's birth was registered in Prescot district, Lancashire, England. He retired to live in the Isle of Man, and he died aged 84 in Onchan, Isle of Man.

Playing career

International honours
Naughton won caps for England while at Warrington in 1953 against France (2 matches), in 1956 against France, and won caps for Great Britain while at Warrington in the 1954 Rugby League World Cup against France (2 matches).

Naughton played left-, i.e. number 4 Great Britain's 13-13 draw with France in the 1954 Rugby League World Cup second group match at Stade Municipal, Toulouse on Sunday 7 November 1954, and Great Britain's 16-12 victory over France in the 1954 Rugby League World Cup Final at Parc des Princes, Paris on Saturday 13 November 1954.

Naughton also represented Great Britain while at Warrington between 1952 and 1956 against France (2 non-Test matches).

Championship final appearances
Naughton played in Warrington's 11-26 defeat by Workington Town in the Championship Final during the 1950–51 season, the 7-3 victory over Oldham in the Championship Final during the 1954–55 season at Maine Road on Saturday 14 May 1955, and played  in the 10-25 defeat by Leeds in the Championship Final during the 1960–61 season at Odsal Stadium, Bradford, this was also his last match for Warrington.

Challenge Cup Final appearance
Naughton played left-, i.e. number 4, in Warrington's 19-0 victory over Widnes in the 1949–50 Challenge Cup Final during the 1949–50 season at Wembley Stadium, London on Saturday 6 May 1950, in front of a crowd of 94,249, but was injured with an aggravated calf injury for both the 4-4 draw with Halifax in the 1953–54 Challenge Cup Final during the 1953–54 season at Wembley Stadium, London on Saturday 1 May 1954, and the 18-4 victory in the 1953–54 Challenge Cup Final replay during the 1953–54 season at Odsal Stadium, Bradford on Wednesday 5 May 1954 in front of a 102,569+ crowd, he was replaced by a young Jim Challinor.

Naughton was on the winning side against his older brother John "Johnny" Naughton, the Widnes , in the Challenge Cup Final during the 1949–50 season.

County Cup Final appearances
Albert Naughton played left-, i.e. number 4, and scored a try in Warrington's 5-28 defeat by Wigan in the 1950–51 Lancashire County Cup Final during the 1950–51 season at Station Road, Swinton on Saturday 4 November 1950, and played in the 5-4 victory over St. Helens in the 1959–60 Lancashire County Cup Final during the 1954–55 season at Central Park, Wigan on Saturday 31 October 1959.

Club career
Naughton became the most expensive player in rugby league when he left Widnes for Warrington for £4,600 during the 1949–50 season, based on increases in average earnings, this would be approximately £396,900 in 2016), he made his début for the Warrington in a friendly match in France, before making his competitive début, and scoring a try in the 17-0 victory over Whitehaven at Wilderspool Stadium.

Honoured at Warrington Wolves
Naughton was inducted into the Warrington Wolves Hall of Fame in 2006 alongside Parry Gordon and George Thomas.

Genealogical information
Naughton's marriage to Deirdre "De" (née Farrell) was registered during third ¼ 1956 in Prescot district. Albert Naughton was the younger brother of the rugby league  who played in the 1940s and 1950s for Widnes; John "Johnny" Naughton (born 5 January 1920 in Prescot district), Teresa "Tess" Naughton (birth registered during fourth ¼ 1921 in Prescot district), and rugby league footballer, Daniel "Danny" Naughton.

Outside of rugby league
Naughton took over from Harry Bath as landlord of the Britannia Inn, Scotland Road, Warrington during February 1957.

References

External links
R.L. Final Replay In England
Rugby League: Sculthorpes Can't Lose
(archived by web.archive.org) Lee Briers joins the 100 club
(archived by web.archive.org) Swinging 60s by Alan Domville
Warrington's World Cup heroes – Albert Naughton
Photograph "A new ground record - The 1950 Challenge Cup Semi-final between Warrington and Leeds set a new attendance record for Odsal of 69,898. Warrington defeated Leeds in the game by 16 points to 4. - 01/01/1950" at www.rlhp.co.uk
(archived by archive.is) RFL celebrates Great Britain's 1954 World Cup success
Statistics at rugby.widnes.tv
Albert Naughton, Warrington Wolves' last Championship-winning captain, dies aged 84
(archived by web.archive.org) Statistics at wolvesplayers.thisiswarrington.co.uk
Photograph of Albert Naughton

1929 births
2013 deaths
England national rugby league team players
English rugby league players
Great Britain national rugby league team players
Lancashire rugby league team players
Rugby league centres
Rugby league locks
Rugby league players from Prescot
Warrington Wolves players
Widnes Vikings players